Loch Ascog is a small reservoir on the east coast of the island of Bute, in the council area of Argyll and Bute, Scotland. The loch supplies water to the town of Rothesay and the fishing rights are held by the Isle of Bute Angling Association. To the west is the much larger Loch Fad.

See also
 Ascog House
 List of lochs in Scotland
 List of reservoirs and dams in the United Kingdom

Notes

Reservoirs in Argyll and Bute
Isle of Bute
Lochs of Scottish islands